Ana Cristina Botero Cadavid (born in Medellín in 1968), is a Colombian actress, mainly active in the world of television, but also with participation in some Colombian plays and films.

Career

Ana Cristina is the daughter of actor, librettist and director Jaime Botero Gómez, niece of actress Dora Cadavid and sister of actors Óscar and María Cecilia Botero. She debuted on television when she was very young in the telenovela Lejos del Nido, starring her sister, María Cecilia and directed by her father, Jaime.

After remaining active in the theater, she returned to television in 1987 to join the cast of the soap opera Destinos Cruzados, a production starring her sister again. Two years later, she appeared in the series Los Dueños del Poder, along with Luis Eduardo Arango, Víctor Mallarino and her sister María Cecilia.

She began the 1990s by joining the cast of the successful telenovela La Casa de las Dos Palmas by Manuel Mejía Vallejo, starring Gustavo Angarita, Vicky Hernández and Edmundo Troya. The same year, she acted in the series Por qué mataron a Betty si era tan buena muchacha? Since 1992, she was part of the cast of the humor series Vuelo secreto, playing Silvia.

In the new millennium, she recorded appearances in the series El Precio del Silencio (2002) and A.M.A. La Academia (2003) before moving to Chile with her husband. She has a child named Santiago Barón Botero, who is very proud of the artistic career of his mother, his aunt Maria Cecilia and his grandfather, Jaime.

Filmography

Television

Botero has participated in the following television programs and series:

 2017 - Infieles: Last episode: Radio taxi
 2012 - 2016 - Mujeres al Límite: Various characters
 2009 - Mariana & Scarlett - Hilos de Amor
 2003 - A.M.A. La Academia
 2002 - El Precio del Silencio: Mireya Botero 
 1992 - La 40, la Calle del Amor
 1992 - Vuelo Secreto
 1991 - La Casa de las Dos Palmas: Laura Gómez
 1990 - Herencia Maldita
 1990 - Por qué mataron a Betty, si era tan buena muchacha?
 1989 - Los Dueños del Poder
 1987 - Alma Fuerte
 1987 - Destino
 1987 - Destinos Cruzados
 1986 - Huracán
 1984 - Las Estrellas de las Baum
 1978 - Lejos del Nido

Movies

She also appeared in the following movies:

 2020 - No Andaba Muerto, Estaba de Parranda: Lucy
 2019 - Feo pero Sabroso:  Cuquita Canosa de la Calva

Theater 

More recently, she participated in the following plays:

 2021 - Caliente Caliente 2
 2019 - Caliente Caliente

See also
 Television in Colombia

References

1968 births
Living people
Colombian telenovela actresses
Colombian women
People from Medellín